This is a list of episodes for the fourth season of the CBS-TV series Alice.

Broadcast history
The season originally aired Sundays at 9:00-9:30 pm (EST).

Episodes

References

1979 American television seasons
1980 American television seasons